Mosab "Jaguar" Amrani (born 25 October 1987 in Amsterdam, Netherlands), is a Moroccan-Dutch middleweight-super welterweight Muay Thai kickboxer fighting out of Amsterdam for Team Amrani.

Biography/Career
Born in Amsterdam, Mosab began most of his early career fighting at around the 61 kg mark on the local scene in the Netherlands and became one of the countries top prospects in the lower weight classes.  He made the transition up in weight to 63.5 kg and made his first impact on the international Muay Thai scene by defeating the legendary Anuwat Kaewsamrit via technical knockout at a SLAMM!! event in 2008 to win his first major honour - the W.M.C. world title.

He held on to his W.M.C. world belt for just seven months when he lost his first title defence against the highly decorated Andrei Kulebin at the Champions of Champions II event in Jamaica.  Mosab made up for this disappointment in the Autumn of 2009 when he beat one of the world's top Muay Thai fighters, Bovy Sor Udomson, to win the W.M.C. intercontinental title, stopping him in the first round in an extremely impressive victory.  

Recently Mosab has made the move up to the 70 kg division where the competition is tougher but the riches are greater.  He has so far shown himself to be a decent acquisition at this level with the It's Showtime organization, having beaten the experienced Chris van Venrooij and dropping a decision in what was a contender for 'fight of the year' against close friend Mohammed Khamal at the end of 2010.

Amrani knocked out Liam Harrison with a liver punch in round one at Glory 5: London on March 23, 2012.

He fought in the eight-man, 65 kg tournament at Glory 8: Tokyo - 2013 65kg Slam in Tokyo, Japan on May 3, 2013. After outpointing Marcus Vinicius in the quarter-finals, he was defeated by Masaaki Noiri via unanimous decision in the semis.

He defeated Yuta Kubo by unanimous decision at Glory 13: Tokyo - Welterweight World Championship Tournament in Tokyo, Japan on December 21, 2013.

He defeated Lim Chi-bin at Qabala Fight Series #1 in Qabala, Azerbaijan on June 29, 2014, dropping the Korean with a knee to the body before finishing him a kick to the same spot shortly after.

Titles
2009 W.M.C. featherweight intercontinental champion -63.5 kg
2009 W.M.C. featherweight world champion -63 kg (0 title defences)
2015 Glory Featherweight Contender Tournament winner

Kickboxing Record 

|-
|-  bgcolor="#FFBBBB"
| 2016-12-10 || Loss ||align=left| Fabio Pinca || Glory 36: Oberhausen || Oberhausen, Germany || Decision (split) || 3 || 3:00
|-
|-  bgcolor="#FFBBBB"
| 2016-03-12 || Loss ||align=left| Serhiy Adamchuk || Glory 28: Paris || Paris, France || Decision (unanimous) || 5 || 3:00
|-
! style=background:white colspan=9 |
|-
|-  bgcolor="#CCFFCC"
| 2015-12-04 || Win ||align=left| Maykol Yurk || Glory 26: Amsterdam - Featherweight Contender Tournament, Final || Amsterdam, Netherlands || KO || 1 || 1:51
|-
! style=background:white colspan=9 |
|-
|-  bgcolor="#CCFFCC"
| 2015-12-04 || Win ||align=left| Lim Chi-bin || Glory 26: Amsterdam - Featherweight Contender Tournament, Semi Finals || Amsterdam, Netherlands || KO || 1 || 1:32
|-
|-  bgcolor="#FFBBBB"
| 2015-11-07 || Loss ||align=left| Qiu Jianliang || Wulinfeng World Championship || Shenyang, China || TKO (doctor stoppage) || 2 || 0:00
|-
|-  bgcolor="#FFBBBB"
| 2015-04-03 || Loss ||align=left| Gabriel Varga || Glory 20: Dubai || Dubai, UAE || Decision (unanimous) || 5 || 3:00
|-
|-  bgcolor="#FFBBBB"
| 2014-11-30|| Loss ||align=left| Hiroaki Suzuki || SHOOT BOXING WORLD TOURNAMENT S-cup 2014, Semi Final || Tokyo, Japan || Decision (Majority) || 3 || 3:00
|-
|-  bgcolor="#CCFFCC"
| 2014-11-30 || Win ||align=left| Akiyo Nishiura || SHOOT BOXING WORLD TOURNAMENT S-cup 2014, Quarter Final || Tokyo Japan || Decision (unanimous) || 3 || 3:00
|-
! style=background:white colspan=9 |
|-  bgcolor="#CCFFCC"
| 2014-06-29 || Win ||align=left| Lim Chi-bin || Qabala Fight Series #1 || Qabala, Azerbaijan || KO (left body kick) || 1 || 1:28
|-
|-  bgcolor="#CCFFCC"
| 2013-12-21 || Win ||align=left| Yuta Kubo || Glory 13: Tokyo || Tokyo, Japan || Decision (unanimous) || 3 || 3:00
|-
|-  bgcolor="#FFBBBB"
| 2013-05-03 || Loss ||align=left| Masaaki Noiri || Glory 8: Tokyo - 65 kg Slam Tournament, Semi Finals || Tokyo, Japan || Decision (unanimous) || 3 || 3:00 
|-
|-  bgcolor="#CCFFCC"
| 2013-05-03 || Win ||align=left| Marcus Vinicius || Glory 8: Tokyo - 65 kg Slam Tournament, Quarter Finals || Tokyo, Japan || Decision (unanimous) || 3 || 3:00 
|-
|-  bgcolor="#CCFFCC"
| 2013-03-23 || Win ||align=left| Liam Harrison || Glory 5: London || London, England || KO (body punch) || 1 || 1:20
|-
|-  bgcolor="#FFBBBB"
| 2011-11-27 || Loss ||align=left| Fabio Pinca || Thai Fight 2011 67 kg Tournament, Semi Final || Bangkok, Thailand || Decision || 3 || 3:00
|-
|-  bgcolor="#CCFFCC"
| 2011-09-25 || Win ||align=left| Ibrahim Chiahou || Thai Fight 2011 67 kg Tournament, Quarter Final || Bangkok, Thailand || Decision || 3 || 3:00
|-
|-  bgcolor="#FFBBBB"
| 2011-07-18 || Loss ||align=left| Lim Chi-bin || REBELS 8 & It's Showtime Japan || Tokyo, Japan ||Ext.R Decision (Unanimous) || 4 || 3:00  
|-
! style=background:white colspan=9 |
|-
|-  bgcolor="#FFBBBB"
| 2011-05-14 || Loss ||align=left| Houcine Bennoui || It's Showtime 2011 Lyon || Lyon, France || TKO (Injury) || 4 || 
|-
|-  bgcolor="#CCFFCC"
| 2011-02-19 || Win ||align=left| Fatih Ozkan || Badboys || Utrecht, Netherlands || Decision (Unanimous) || 3 || 3:00
|-
|-  bgcolor="#FFBBBB"
| 2010-12-18 || Loss ||align=left| Mohammed Khamal || Fightclub presents: It's Showtime 2010 || Amsterdam, Netherlands || Ext.R Decision (4-1) || 4 || 3:00 
|-
|-  bgcolor="#CCFFCC"
| 2010-09-24 || Win ||align=left| Evgeniy Kurovskoy || FNFN @ The Sand || Amsterdam, Netherlands || Decision || 3 || 3:00
|-
|-  bgcolor="#CCFFCC"
| 2010-09-12 || Win ||align=left| Chris van Venrooij || Fightingstars presents: It's Showtime 2010 || Amsterdam, Netherlands || Decision (5-0) || 3 || 3:00
|-
|-  bgcolor="#CCFFCC"
| 2010-02-27 || Win ||align=left| Abid Boudhan || Amsterdam Fight Club || Amsterdam, Netherlands || Decision || 5 || 3:00
|-
|-  bgcolor="#CCFFCC"
| 2009-11-29 || Win ||align=left| Bovy Sor Udomson || SLAMM "Nederland vs Thailand VI" || Almere, Netherlands || KO || 1 ||
|-
! style=background:white colspan=9 |
|-
|-  bgcolor="#FFBBBB"
| 2009-06-09 || Loss ||align=left| Andrei Kulebin || Champions of Champions II || Montego Bay, Jamaica || Decision (Unanimous) || 5 || 3:00 
|-
! style=background:white colspan=9 |
|- 
|-  bgcolor="#CCFFCC"
| 2009-04-09 || Win ||align=left| Reuben Narain || Amsterdam Fight Club || Amsterdam, Netherlands || Decision || 5 || 3:00
|-
|-  bgcolor="#CCFFCC"
| 2009-03-01 || Win ||align=left| Robert van Nimwegen || K-1 World MAX 2009 Europe, Super Fight || Utrecht, Netherlands || Decision (Unanimous) || 3 || 3:00
|-
|-  bgcolor="#CCFFCC"
| 2008-11-30 || Win ||align=left| Anuwat Kaewsamrit || SLAMM "Nederland vs Thailand V" || Almere, Netherlands || TKO (Doc Stop/Cut) || 4 || 1:52
|-
! style=background:white colspan=9 |
|- 
|-  bgcolor="#CCFFCC"
| 2008-09-21 || Win ||align=left| Martin Akhtar || SLAMM "Back to the Old Skool" || Amsterdam, Netherlands || Decision || 5 || 3:00
|-
|-  bgcolor="#CCFFCC"
| 2007-11-07 || Win ||align=left| Rodney Doorje || Morocco vs Suriname || Netherlands || Decision || 5 || 3:00
|-
|-  bgcolor="#CCFFCC"
| 2007-06-02 || Win ||align=left| Arjum Muradian || Muaythai Gala "Best of West", Sporthal Aristos || Amsterdam, Netherlands || Decision || 5 || 3:00
|-
|-  bgcolor="#CCFFCC"
| 2006-11-19 || Win ||align=left| Richard Asare || Rumble of Amsterdam IV || Amsterdam, Netherlands || Decision || 5 || 3:00
|-
|-  bgcolor="#c5d2ea"
| 2006-09-24 || Draw ||align=left| Derryl Misiedjan || Muaythai Gala Zonnehuis || Amsterdam, Netherlands || Decision Draw || 5 || 3:00
|-
|-  bgcolor="#CCFFCC"
| 2006-05-27 || Win ||align=left| Samuel Wia || Beatdown || Amsterdam, Netherlands || Decision || 5 || 3:00
|-
|-  bgcolor="#CCFFCC"
| 2006-03-18 || Win ||align=left| Rodney Doorje || Beatdown, Zonnehuis || Amsterdam, Netherlands || Decision (Unanimous) || 5 || 3:00
|-
|-  bgcolor="#CCFFCC"
| 2005-11-20 || Win ||align=left| Nordin Kassrioui || Event Plaza II || Rijswijk, Netherlands || Decision || 5 || 2:00
|- 
|-  bgcolor="#CCFFCC"
| 2005-04-23 || Win ||align=left| Charlton Gijsbertha || N.K.A. Youth Cup, Semi Finals -63.5 kg || Amsterdam, Netherlands || Decision || 4 || 2:00
|-
! style=background:white colspan=9 |
|- 
|-  bgcolor="#FFBBBB"
| 2005-02-27 || Loss ||align=left| Jordan Watson || Master Sken's Fight Night || Manchester, England, UK || TKO (Cut/Elbow) || 4 ||
|-
|-  bgcolor="#CCFFCC"
| 2005-02-19 || Win ||align=left| Hamza Rahmani || Test of Talent 4 || Mortsel, Belgium || Decision || 5 || 2:00
|-
|-  bgcolor="#CCFFCC"
| 2004-12-18 || Win ||align=left| Mohamed El-Mir || El Otmani Gym Gala, Sporthal Jan van Galen|| Amsterdam, Netherlands || Decision || 5 || 2:00
|-
|-  bgcolor="#CCFFCC"
| 2004-12-03 || Win ||align=left| Mustafa Gunes || Muay Thai Gala || Katwijk, Netherlands || TKO (Gave Up) || 1 ||
|-
|-  bgcolor="#FFBBBB"
| 2004-10-10 || Loss ||align=left| Chafik Salahedine || Jellema || Netherlands || Decision || ||
|-
|-  bgcolor="#c5d2ea"
| 2004-06-05 || Draw ||align=left| Youssouf Aknenni || || Netherlands || Decision Draw || 5 || 2:00
|-
|-  bgcolor="#CCFFCC"
| 2004-04-24 || Win ||align=left| Kees Vergouwen || Fight Club, Wellness Profi Center || Purmerend, Netherlands || Decision || 5 || 2:00
|-
|-  bgcolor="#c5d2ea"
| 2004-04-12 || Draw ||align=left| Ben Simmed || Morocco Earthquake Benefit Gala || Amsterdam, Netherlands || Decision Draw || 5 || 2:00
|-
|-  bgcolor="#CCFFCC"
| 2004-?-? || Win ||align=left| Phil Ireland ||  ||  || KO || ||
|-
|-  bgcolor="#CCFFCC"
| 2003-11-23 || Win ||align=left| Kazim Celen || Veni Vici Vedi II || Veenendaal, Netherlands || TKO (Doctor stoppage) || || 
|-
|-  bgcolor="#c5d2ea"
| 2003-11-02 || Draw ||align=left| Adil Ait Ali || Immortality || Netherlands || Decision Draw || 3 || 2:00
|-
|-  bgcolor="#CCFFCC"
| 2003-02-02 || Win ||align=left| Said Lahri || Killer Dome II || Amsterdam, Netherlands || Decision || 2 || 1:30
|-
|-
| colspan=9 | Legend:

See also 
List of K-1 events
List of It's Showtime events
List of male kickboxers

References

External links
 MOSAB - THE JAGUAR - AMRANI (Dutch Language)
 mousidgym (Dutch Language)

1987 births
Living people
Dutch male kickboxers
Moroccan male kickboxers
Welterweight kickboxers
Featherweight kickboxers
Dutch Muay Thai practitioners
Moroccan Muay Thai practitioners
Dutch sportspeople of Moroccan descent
Glory kickboxers
Sportspeople from Amsterdam